The 2018 U.S. Men's Clay Court Championships (also known as the Fayez Sarofim & Co. U.S. Men's Clay Court Championships for sponsorship purposes) was a tennis tournament played on outdoor clay courts. It was the 117th edition of the U.S. Men's Clay Court Championships, and an ATP World Tour 250 event on the 2018 ATP World Tour. It took place at River Oaks Country Club in Houston, Texas, United States, from April 9 through April 15, 2018.

Singles main draw entrants

Seeds

Rankings are as of April 2, 2018.

Other entrants
The following players received wildcards into the main draw:
  Dustin Brown
  Nick Kyrgios 
  Mackenzie McDonald

The following players received entry via the qualifying draw:
  Miomir Kecmanović 
  Stefan Kozlov 
  Denis Kudla
  Yoshihito Nishioka

Withdrawals 
Before the tournament
  Kevin Anderson → replaced by  Blaž Kavčič
  Jérémy Chardy → replaced by  Taro Daniel
  Chung Hyeon → replaced by  Bjorn Fratangelo
  Lukáš Lacko → replaced by  Tim Smyczek
  Feliciano López → replaced by  Henri Laaksonen
  John Millman → replaced by  Ernesto Escobedo

Doubles main draw entrants

Seeds

 Rankings are as of April 2, 2018.

Other entrants
The following pairs received wildcards into the doubles main draw:
  Dustin Brown /  Frances Tiafoe
  Ivo Karlović /  Daniel Nestor

Champions

Singles

  Steve Johnson def.  Tennys Sandgren, 7–6(7–2), 2–6, 6–4

Doubles

  Max Mirnyi /  Philipp Oswald def.  Andre Begemann /  Antonio Šančić, 6–7(2–7), 6–4, [11–9]

References

External links

Official website

 
U.S. Men's Clay Court Championships
Usmensclay
U.S. Men's Clay Court Championships